Rhyacia arenacea is a moth of the family Noctuidae. It is widespread in the steppe and semi-desert zone of the central Palearctic realm.

Adults are on wing from May to October. There is one generation per year.

The larvae probably feed on Poaceae species.

External links
 Noctuinae of Israel

Noctuinae
Moths of Europe
Moths of Asia
Moths of the Middle East